Grace Union Church and Cemetery is a historic church and national historic district located near Newton, Catawba County, North Carolina. It was built in 1857, and is a one-story, brick, Greek Revival-style church.  Also on the property is the Grace Union Cemetery, with gravestones dated as early as 1822.

It was added to the National Register of Historic Places in 1990.

References

External links
 
 Grace Lutheran Church – modern church succeeding the original

Cemeteries on the National Register of Historic Places in North Carolina
Historic districts on the National Register of Historic Places in North Carolina
Churches on the National Register of Historic Places in North Carolina
Greek Revival church buildings in North Carolina
Churches completed in 1857
19th-century churches in the United States
Churches in Catawba County, North Carolina
National Register of Historic Places in Catawba County, North Carolina
1857 establishments in North Carolina